Nouvielgane is a village in the Dolo Department of Bougouriba Province in south western Burkina Faso. The village had an estimated population of 168 in 2005.

References

Populated places in the Sud-Ouest Region (Burkina Faso)
Bougouriba Province